The BL class are a class of diesel locomotives built by Clyde Engineering, Rosewater, for Australian National between 1983 and 1986. All but BL35 remain in service with Pacific National.

History
In 1982, Australian National placed an order for with Clyde Engineering for 15 Electro-Motive Diesel JT26C-2SS locomotives (an evolution of the New South Wales 81 class locomotive), to be classed BL and numbered 26 through 40. Australian National only took delivery of the first 10, with the other five delivered to V/Line as their G class. The first five were delivered with standard gauge bogies, the last five with broad gauge bogies.

The 10 Australian National locomotives were transferred to National Rail and converted to standard gauge in 1995, following the conversion of the Adelaide to Melbourne line. In December 1996, they began to operate on services to Sydney and Newcastle. In September 1998, after being repainted into SteelLink livery by Rail Services Australia, Chullora, four were transferred back to the broad gauge to haul steel trains for BHP from Long Island to Dynon. For a period in the late 1990s, they were rostered to haul The Overland between Melbourne and Adelaide.

, three were in service on the broad gauge, six on the standard gauge and one is in store.

BL35 suffered a fire which damaged the roof, and is now stored at Werris Creek, awaiting scrapping.

Status Table

Model railways

HO Scale
Powerline released models of the first two batches of BL class locomotives in Australian National Green (with grey roof) in 1989, then with a new motor type in 1997. The first run included BL 27 and 29 with a single motor, and 26 "Bob Hawke", 28 and 30 with dual motors. The second run had BL locomotives painted in National Rail colours, this time with locomotives 27 and 29 as single-motor and 35 as double-motor.

In 2014, Austrains released models of the BL class locomotive, retailing at about $300 per model, plus $100 for pre-fitted DCC and Sound. The range included BL 26 "Bob Hawke", 28 in Australian National Green, 27 and 35 in the National Rail Arrowhead scheme, 31 and 32 in the standard National Rail scheme, 29 and 30 in National Rail "Steelink", and 33 and 34 in Pacific National blue and yellow.

Auscision Models has announced a future project comprising BL 26, 28 and 31 in variants of Australian National Green and gold, BL 29 and 35 in National Rail orange and grey, 32 and 34 with a darker charcoal grey, BL 30 and 33 in Steelink grey, and locomotives 26, 27, 28 and 35 in Pacific National blue and yellow. The models are expected to be delivered either as DC, or for an additional charge they could be pre-fitted with DCC and Sound.

N Scale
Aust-N-Rail made available in 2009 (2019?) a BL 32W "Alan Cogger" in Australian National Green, based on a Kato bottom engine kit.

References

External links

Clyde Engineering locomotives
Co-Co locomotives
Pacific National diesel locomotives
Railway locomotives introduced in 1983
Standard gauge locomotives of Australia
Broad gauge locomotives in Australia
Diesel-electric locomotives of Australia